Faux passeports subtitled 'ou les mémoires d'un agitateur' in its original version, is a Belgian novel by Charles Plisnier. It was first published by Corrêa in 1937. It received the prestigious Prix Goncourt, making Plisnier the first foreigner to win the prize.

References 

1937 Belgian novels
French-language novels
Prix Goncourt winning works